Bruce Hill may refer to:

Bruce Hill (American football) (born 1964), former wide receiver in NFL football
Bruce Hill (racing driver) (1949–2017), former American stock car driver